The Znamenskoye Grozny suicide bombing happened on May 12, 2003, in Znamenskoye in Chechnya, when three rebel suicide bombers, including two women, drove a truck bomb into a local government administration and the Federal Security Service of the Russian Federation (FSB) directorate complex, killing at least 59 people and injuring about 200, mostly civilians.

The complex contained the republican headquarters of the FSB. The mainstream wing of the rebels led by Aslan Maskhadov denied involvement and condemned the attack.

A Chechen warlord Khozh-Akhmed Dushayev was blamed for organizing the blast. No formal charges were ever brought and Dushayev was killed in Ingushetia in June 2003.

References

External links
40 killed by truck bomb, The Sydney Morning Herald, May 13 2003
Suspects named as Znamenskoye death toll rises, Gazeta.ru, May 13 2003

Suicide bombings in 2003
21st-century mass murder in Russia
Attacks in Russia in 2003
Mass murder in 2003
Suicide bombing in the Chechen wars
Suicide car and truck bombings in Europe
Terrorist incidents in Russia in 2003
May 2003 events in Russia
2003 in Chechnya
2003 in Russia